Welcome to the Club is the first live album by Ian Hunter. After the unexpected success of You're Never Alone with a Schizophrenic, Chrysalis Records wanted to keep the momentum by releasing another album. Because Hunter never wrote when he was on the road, it became a live album which was recorded at the Roxy Theatre (West Hollywood) over seven nights in November 1979 during his U.S tour. However, there were four new tracks (all of side four) three of which were recorded live in studio.

Track listing
All tracks written by Ian Hunter except where noted.

Side one
"F.B.I." (Hank Marvin, Bruce Welch, Jet Harris) – 3:51
"Once Bitten Twice Shy" – 5:25
"Angeline" – 4:56
"Laugh at Me" (Sonny Bono) – 3:40
"All the Way from Memphis" – 3:33
Side two
"I Wish I Was Your Mother" – 6:47
"Irene Wilde" – 4:13
"Just Another Night" (Hunter, Mick Ronson) – 6:03
"Cleveland Rocks" – 6:01
Side three
"Standin' in My Light" – 5:49
"Bastard" – 8:12
"Walking with a Mountain/Rock 'n' Roll Queen" (Hunter, Mick Ralphs) – 4:19
"All the Young Dudes" (David Bowie) – 3:30
"Slaughter on Tenth Avenue" (Richard Rodgers) – 2:25
Side four
Recorded live at Media Sound, New York City; 10, 11 January 1980 except track 4 which was recorded at the same shows as the rest of the album. 
"We Gotta Get Out of Here" – 3:14
"Silver Needles" – 5:56
"Man O' War" (Hunter, Ronson) – 4:19
"Sons and Daughters" – 5:04

CD reissue
Disc 1
"F.B.I." (Hank Marvin, Bruce Welch, Jet Harris) – 3:51
"Once Bitten, Twice Shy" – 5:25
"Angeline" – 4:56
"Laugh at Me" (Sonny Bono) – 3:40
"All the Way from Memphis" – 3:33
"I Wish I Was Your Mother" – 6:47
"Irene Wilde" – 4:13
"Just Another Night" (Hunter, Mick Ronson) – 6:03
"Cleveland Rocks" – 6:01
"Standin' in My Light" – 5:49
"Bastard" – 8:12

Disc 2
"Walking with a Mountain/Rock 'n' Roll Queen" (Hunter, Mick Ralphs) – 4:19
"All the Young Dudes" (David Bowie) – 3:30
"Slaughter on Tenth Avenue" (Richard Rodgers) – 2:25
"One of the Boys" (Hunter, Ralphs) – 7:36
"The Golden Age of Rock 'n' Roll" – 4:01
"When the Daylight Comes" – 9:00
"Medley: Once Bitten Twice Shy/Bastard/Cleveland Rocks" – 6:10
"We Gotta Get Out of Here" – 3:14
"Silver Needles" – 5:56
"Man O' War" (Hunter, Ronson) – 4:19
"Sons and Daughters" – 5:04

Personnel
Ian Hunter - lead vocals, guitar, piano, harp
Mick Ronson - lead guitar, Moog synthesizer, mandolin, vocals
Tommy Morrongiello - guitar, vocals
Tommy Mandel - keyboards
Martin Briley - bass
Eric Parker - drums
George Meyer - keyboards, vocals, saxophone
Ellen Foley, Susie Ronson - vocals on "Standin' in My Light"

References

Ian Hunter (singer) albums
Albums produced by Mick Ronson
1980 live albums
Chrysalis Records live albums
Albums recorded at the Roxy Theatre